Kulm District is a district in the canton of Aargau, Switzerland. It is located west of Lake Hallwil and covers parts of the Wyna and Suhre valleys. The principal town is Unterkulm; the largest municipality is Reinach.

Geography
Of this area,  or 49.8% is used for agricultural purposes, while  or 31.8% is forested. Of the rest of the land,  or 14.2% is settled (buildings or roads).

Demographics
, 22.6% of the population are foreign nationals.

Economy
 there were 18,062 workers who lived in the municipality.  Of these, 12,740 or about 70.5% of the residents worked outside the district while 7,159 people commuted into the district for work.  There were a total of 12,481 jobs (of at least 6 hours per week) in the district.

Religion
Of the rest of the population, there were 30 individuals (or about 0.08% of the population) who belonged to the Christian Catholic faith.

Education
Of the school age population, there are 2,711 students attending primary school, there are 1,174 students attending secondary school, there are 755 students attending tertiary or university level schooling, and there are 12 students who are seeking a job after school in the municipality.

Municipalities

Mergers
The following changes to the district's municipalities have occurred since 2000:
 On 1 January 2023 the municipality of Burg merged into Menziken.

References

Districts of Aargau